This is a complete filmography of American actor Hoot Gibson (August 6, 1892 – August 23, 1962), including his performances between 1910 and 1960. Gibson appeared in more than 200 films.

Background
Gibson's career began in 1910 with early silent film "shorts", and he continued as a movie star once "talkies" were introduced, his first sound film being The Long, Long Trail (1929). Primarily starring in Western films, Gibson worked with many directors, including John Ford, who would direct many popular American Westerns and Civil War films, over his fifty years of film production, including The Horse Soldiers (1959), starring John Wayne, in which Gibson played a supporting role. As with many silent and early recordings, a number of Gibson's films are considered to be lost.

Filmography

Notes

References
 
 Fagen, Herb (2003). The Encyclopedia of Westerns. New York: Facts On File. .

Gibson, Hoot
Gibson, Hoot